Colegrove may refer to:
Colegrove (surname), surname (includes list)
Colegrove, Los Angeles, settlement now part of Hollywood
Colegrove, Pennsylvania
Colegrove v. Green